is a monorail station on the Osaka Monorail located in Ibaraki, Osaka, Japan.

Lines
Osaka Monorail Main Line (Station Number: 18)

Layout
There is an island platform and two tracks elevated. The platform is sealed in with glass walls and doors.

History 
The original name of the station, Ibaraki, was the same as the city's main JR train station although there was no direct connection between the JR station and the monorail station. This caused confusion among passengers and finally the monorail station was renamed.

 June 1, 1990: station opened as Ibaraki Station (茨木駅)
 April 1, 1997: renamed as Unobe Station

Stations next to Unobe

	

Ibaraki, Osaka
Osaka Monorail stations
Railway stations in Japan opened in 1990